Alterations is a two-part 1988 Australian television film for the ABC shot in 1987 at Canberra. It deals with a married couple and their respective affairs. The cast consists of the following:
 Richard Moir as Richard
 Angela Punch-McGregor as Ann
 Linden Wilkinson as Martha
 Steven Jacobs as Michael
 Gillian Jones as Rachel
 Alan David Lee as Robert
 Kim Krejus as Eleanor
 Karen Linley as Alice (child in 1983)
 Michelle Linley as Alice (child in 1986)
 Tim Drummond as Duncan (child in 1983)
 Scott Bartle as Duncan (child in 1986)

References

External links

Australian television films
1988 television films
1988 films
Films directed by Julian Pringle
1980s English-language films